John Charles Depler (January 6, 1899 – December 5, 1970) was a professional football player and coach. Prior to his professional career, he played college football for the Illinois Fighting Illini football team of the University of Illinois.  There he helped lead Illinois to its second national championship in 1919, and earned first-team All-American honors in 1920. After graduation, Depler played for the Hammond Pros of the National Football League (NFL). The following year, he was hired as an assistant coach to Frank "Buck" O'Neill, at Columbia University, where he stayed for the next eight seasons.

In 1929, Depler rejoined the NFL as a player-coach with the Orange Tornadoes. In following season, he bought the Dayton Triangles and relocated the team to Brooklyn, New York, with the help of Bill Dwyer, an early Prohibition gangster and bootlegger. Depler was now the co-founder and coach of the NFL's new Brooklyn Dodgers. He took most of the members of the 1929 Tornadoes with him for the new Dodgers team.

After a successful first season, little went right for the club. After the team's second season, Depler resigned as coach and the team was sold to Chris Cagle and Shipwreck Kelly.

References

1970 deaths
American football centers
American football tackles
Brooklyn Dodgers (NFL) coaches
Columbia Lions football coaches
Hammond Pros players
Illinois Fighting Illini football players
Orange Tornadoes coaches
Orange Tornadoes players
National Football League owners
People from Lewistown, Illinois
Players of American football from Illinois
1899 births
Psi Upsilon